40 Persei is a wide binary star system in the northern constellation of Perseus. It has the Bayer designation ο Persei, while 40 Persei is the Flamsteed designation. The system is visible to the naked eye as a faint, blue-white hued point of light with an apparent visual magnitude of 4.97. It is located approximately 1060 light years away from the Sun based on parallax, and is drifting further away with a radial velocity of +22 km/s. The system is a member of the Perseus OB2 association of co-moving stars.

The primary component is a massive B-type main-sequence star with a stellar classification of B0.5V. It is about 7.2 million years old and has a very low projected rotational velocity for an early B-type star, measured at 10 km/s.

References

B-type main-sequence stars
A-type main-sequence stars
Binary stars
Perseus (constellation)
Persei, o
Persei, 40
BD+33 698
022951
017313
1123